The iBOT is a powered wheelchair developed by Dean Kamen in a partnership between DEKA and Johnson & Johnson's Independence Technology division.

History
Development of the iBOT started in 1990 with the first working prototypes available in 1992. In late 1994, DEKA signed a deal with Johnson & Johnson to manufacture the unit, with Johnson & Johnson paying for all subsequent R&D with DEKA receiving a smaller royalty fee than they normally would in return for their retaining rights to all non-medical applications of the technology. Much of the manufacturing work for what was then a very secretive "Project FRED" was done at an SCI (Now Sanmina SCI) plant in Lacy's Spring, Alabama near SCI's corporate headquarters in Huntsville, Alabama. SCI was partnered with Criticon (Johnson & Johnson medical devices) to do development and manufacturing. Development of the iBOT was conducted at DEKA in Manchester, NH.

The iBOT was revealed to the public on Dateline NBC in a segment by John Hockenberry on June 30, 1999. By this time, Johnson & Johnson had already spent  on the project. The iBOT entered clinical trials in 1999, with FDA clearance arriving four years after the reveal on August 13, 2003.

During development the iBOT was nicknamed Fred after Fred Astaire. The Segway PT, a non-medical device which resulted from the product development of the iBOT, was nicknamed Ginger (after Ginger Rogers, Fred Astaire's dance partner). The Segway PT was released in 2001.

Johnson & Johnson formed Independence Technology to bring the iBOT 4000 to the market. The iBOT 4000 began shipping to customers in 2005. Starting in 2009, the iBOT was no longer available for sale from Independence Technology, but support for existing units was available until the end of 2013. Production was discontinued for cost reasons; only a few hundred were sold per year at a retail price of about $25,000, and insurance only reimbursed $5,000. In 2011, Dean Kamen, the inventor of the iBOT, stated his support of America's Huey 091 Foundation's effort to reinstate iBOT production.

In late 2014, Kamen announced that the FDA had reclassified the iBOT from a Class III to a Class II medical device. This lowering of regulatory controls allowed DEKA to revive the long dormant iBOT and immediately start development on a next generation product. Kamen said the new iBOT would be out in “less than two years" and would be available initially to wounded veterans.

In 2016, Toyota and DEKA formed a partnership to produce a new version of the iBOT.

In 2019, the next generation iBOT® PMD (Personal Mobility Device) was released to market, and is being distributed and sold through Mobius Mobility in Manchester, NH. The iBOT® PMD features all of the same independence, access, and quality of life enhancements that the original iBOT 4000 boasted, but now with configurable rehab seating to make the iBOT® PMD accessible to a larger population.

Features
The iBOT® PMD has a number of features distinguishing it from most powered wheelchairs:
 By rotating its two sets of powered wheels about each other, the iBOT® PMD can "walk" up and down stairs, much like a cog railway or a rack and pinion with the two wheels as the "teeth" of the gear. The wheels can roll slightly at each step to compensate for a wide range of stair dimensions. When stair-climbing without assistance, the user requires a sturdy handrail and a strong grip. With an assistant, neither a handrail nor a strong grip is required.
 The iBOT® PMD is capable of tethered remote control operation, useful for loading the wheelchair up ramps into vehicles, or "parking" out of the way when not occupied.
 Software receives data via various sensors and gyroscopes, allowing the iBOT® PMD to maintain balance during certain maneuvers. For example, during curb climbing, the seat remains level while parts of the chassis tilt to climb the curb.
 The iBOT® PMD allows the user to rise from a sitting level to approximately 6' tall, measured from the ground to the top of the head, and depending on the size of the occupant. It does this by raising one pair of wheels above the other to elevate the chassis, while a separate actuator raises the seat slightly more than usual. In this configuration, the device is on two wheels, and the 'iBALANCE' software and gyroscope signals control the iBOT® PMD to maintain equilibrium, balancing much like the Segway (which was a spin-off from the iBOT development). The user may also drive in this 2-wheeled, balancing configuration.
 It can climb and descend curbs ranging from 0.1 to 5.0 inches, according to the manufacturer's specifications. The limits are determined by the rider's technique and risk tolerance.
 It is capable of traveling through many types of terrain, including sand, gravel, and water up to 3" deep.
The iBOT® PMD is cleared by the FDA for occupied transport, which means a user can remain seated in their IBOT® PMD while in a moving vehicle as long as the device is secured properly.

References

External links
 
 Independence Technology, L.L.C.

American inventions
Assistive technology
Electric vehicles
Johnson & Johnson
Toyota